Year 1435 (MCDXXXV) was a common year starting on Saturday (link will display the full calendar) of the Julian calendar, the 1435th year of the Common Era (CE) and Anno Domini (AD) designations, the 435th year of the 2nd millennium, the 35th year of the 15th century, and the 6th year of the 1430s decade.

Events 
 January–December 
 January 11 – Sweden's first Riksdag of the Estates is summoned under rebel leader Engelbrekt Engelbrektsson, who is elected rikshövitsman (military commander of the realm), in the absence of a king, on January 13.
 January 13 – Sicut Dudum, a papal bull forbidding the enslavement of the Guanche natives in Canary Islands by the Spanish, is promulgated by Pope Eugene IV.
 February 2 – The Kingdom of Naples passes to  René of Anjou.
 By August – Battle of Podraga: Brothers Iliaș and Stephen II battle to a draw for the throne of Moldavia, leading to a joint rule by them, helped by the intervention of the Polish king.
 August 5 – Battle of Ponza: In a naval battle, the Duchy of Milan decisively defeats Alfonso V of Aragon who is captured.
 September 1 – Battle of Wiłkomierz: Sigismund Kęstutaitis decisively defeats  Grand Duke Švitrigaila, in the decisive battle of the civil war in the Grand Duchy of Lithuania. 
 September 21 – The Treaty of Arras between Charles VII of France and Philip III of Burgundy ends the English-Burgundian alliance.
 October 14 – Eric of Pomerania is reinstated as king of Sweden, only briefly, however, he is once again deposed in January of the following year.

 Date unknown 
 Francis of Paola founds the Order of the Minims in Italy.
 China returns to a policy of isolation.
 Gil Eanes and Afonso Gonçalves Baldaia explore the coast of Africa, as far as the Angra dos Ruivos (in modern-day Western Sahara).
 Enea Piccolomini, the future Pope Pius II, is sent by Cardinal Albergati on a secret mission to Scotland and Northern England.

Births 
 February 1 – Amadeus IX, Duke of Savoy (d. 1472)
 April 8 – John Clifford, 9th Baron de Clifford, English noble (d. 1461)
 April 16 – Jan II the Mad, Duke of Żagań (1439–1449 and 1461–1468 and again in 1472) (d. 1504)
 May 4 – Joan of France, Duchess of Bourbon, French princess (d. 1482)
 October 24 – Andrea della Robbia, Italian artist (d. 1525)
 date unknown
 Jean Molinet, French poet and chronicler (d. 1507)
 Kim Si-seup, Korean scholar and author (d. 1493)
 Sophie of Pomerania, Duchess of Pomerania (d. 1497) 
 Thomas Stanley, 1st Earl of Derby (d. 1504)
 probable
 Johannes Tinctoris, Flemish music theorist and composer (approximate date; d. 1511)
 Andrea del Verrocchio, Florentine sculptor (approximate date; d. 1488)

Deaths 
 January 31 – Xuande Emperor of China (b. 1399)
 February 2 – Queen Joanna II of Naples (b. 1371)
 March 27 – Spytek z Tarnowa i Jarosławia, Polish nobleman
 June 12 – John FitzAlan, 14th Earl of Arundel, English military leader (b. 1408)
 September 9 – Sir Robert Harling, English knight under the Duke of Bedford
 September 14 – John of Lancaster, 1st Duke of Bedford, regent of England (b. 1389)
 September 24 – Isabeau of Bavaria, queen of Charles VI of France
 September 27 – Savvatiy, Russian monastery founder
 October 9 – Paweł Włodkowic, Polish scholar (b. 1370)
 October 13 – Hermann II of Celje, Ban of Croatia
 December 30 – Bonne of Berry, Regent of Savoy (b. 1362)

See also 
 Standard and most common railway gauge in millimetres operated by about 61% of the world railways.

References